This is a list of North Carolina Confederate Civil War units.  The list of North Carolina Union Civil War regiments is shown separately.

Infantry

 1st (Bethel Regiment) Infantry (6 months)
 1st Infantry
 2nd Infantry
 3rd Infantry
 4th Infantry
 5th Infantry
 6th Infantry
 7th Infantry
 8th Infantry
 11th (Bethel Regiment) Infantry
 12th Infantry
 13th Infantry
 14th Infantry
 15th Infantry
 16th Infantry
 17th Infantry
 18th Infantry
 20th Infantry
 21st Infantry
 22nd Infantry
 23rd Infantry
 24th Infantry
 25th Infantry
 26th Infantry
 27th Infantry
 28th Infantry
 29th Infantry
 30th Infantry
 31st Infantry
 32nd Infantry
 33rd Infantry
 34th Infantry
 35th Infantry
 37th Infantry
 38th Infantry
 39th Infantry

 42nd Infantry
 43rd Infantry
 44th Infantry
 45th Infantry
 46th Infantry
 47th Infantry
 48th Infantry
 49th Infantry
 50th Infantry
 51st Infantry
 52nd Infantry
 53rd Infantry
 54th Infantry
 55th Infantry
 56th Infantry
 57th Infantry
 58th Infantry
 60th Infantry
 61st Infantry
 62nd Infantry
 64th Infantry (11th Battalion, Allen's Regiment)
 66th Infantry
 67th Infantry
 68th Infantry
 69th Infantry
 2nd Infantry Battalion
 6th Infantry Battalion (Cohoon's Battalion, Virginia Infantry)
 9th (1st) Battalion, Sharpshooters
 13th Infantry Battalion
 17th (Avery's) Battalion
 18th (McRae's) Battalion 
 25th (Bingham's) Battalion 
 Singletary's Battalion (27th Infantry)
 Rogers' Battalion (47th Infantry)
 Williams' Battalion (32nd Infantry)

Junior Reserves
 1st Junior Reserves (70th Infantry)
 2nd Junior Reserves (71st Infantry)
 3rd Junior Reserves (72nd Infantry)
 1st Battalion, Junior Reserves
 2nd Battalion, Junior Reserves
 4th Battalion, Junior Reserves
 5th Battalion, Junior Reserves
 6th Battalion, Junior Reserves
 7th Battalion, Junior Reserves
 8th Battalion, Junior Reserves
 9th Battalion, Junior Reserves
 Millard's Battalion, Junior Reserves (20th Battalion)

Senior Reserves
 4th Senior Reserves (73rd Infantry)
 5th Senior Reserves (74th Infantry)
 6th Senior Reserves (76th Infantry)
 7th Senior Reserves (77th Infantry)
 8th Senior Reserves (78th Infantry)
 3rd Battalion, Senior Reserves
 Erwin's Battalion, Senior Reserves (21st Battalion)
 Hill's Battalion, Senior Reserves (22nd Battalion)
 Littlejohn's Battalion, Senior Reserves (23rd Battalion)

Cavalry
 1st Cavalry (9th State Troops)
 2nd Cavalry (19th State Troops)
 3rd Cavalry (41st State Troops)
 4th Cavalry (59th State Troops)
 5th Cavalry (63rd State Troops)
 6th Cavalry (65th State Troops)
 7th Cavalry (75th State Troops)
 8th Cavalry (79th State Troops)
 5th Battalion, Cavalry
 7th Battalion, Cavalry
 12th Battalion, Cavalry
 13th Battalion, Cavalry (66th Infantry)
 14th Battalion, Cavalry
 15th Battalion, Cavalry, State Service
 16th Battalion, Cavalry

Partisan Rangers
 4th Battalion, Partisan Rangers  (66th Infantry)
 8th Battalion, Partisan Rangers (13th Battalion, Cavalry)
 11th Battalion, Partisan Rangers 
 Evans' Battalion, Partisan Rangers (63rd Infantry)
 Lawrence's Company, Volunteers (Wilson Partisan Rangers)
 Swindell's Company, Partisan Rangers

Artillery
 1st Artillery (10th State Troops)
 2nd Artillery (36th State Troops)
Wilmington Horse Artillery (Company A) (Southerlands's Battery)
 3rd Artillery (40th State Troops)

Light Artillery
 3rd Battalion, Light Artillery
 Edenton Bell Battery (Company B)
 13th Battalion, Light Artillery

Heavy Artillery
 1st Battalion, Heavy Artillery (9th Battalion)
 2nd Battalion, Heavy Artillery (10th Battalion)

Legions
 Thomas' Legion
 69th Infantry Regiment
 Walker's Cavalry Battalion
 Cherockee Battalion
 Levi's (Barr's) Battery, Light Artillery

Miscellaneous

 1st Detailed Men (81st State Troops)
 2nd Detailed Men (82nd State Troops)
 3rd Detailed Men (83rd State Troops)
 2nd Conscripts
 6th Battalion, Armory Guards
 19th (Mallett's) Battalion (Camp Guard) 
 Cumberland County Battalion, Detailed Men 
 McLean's Battalion, Light Duty Men 
 Rencher's Battalion, Detailed Men (24th Battalion)
 Bank's Company (Currituck Guard) 
 Bass' Company 
 Brown's Company 
 Doughton's Company (Alleghany Grays) 
 Galloway's Company, Coast Guards 
 Giddins Company (Detailed and Petitioned Men) 
 Howard's Company, Prison Guards 
 Jones' Company (Supporting Force)
 Mallett's Company 
 McDugald's Company
 McMillan's Company 
 Conscripts, Unassigned
 Moseley's Company (Sampson Artillery) 
 Townsend's Company (State Troops) 
 Wallace's Company (Wilmington Railroad Guard)
 Miscellaneous

Militia
 1st Militia
 15th Militia
 30th Militia
 33rd Militia
 51st Militia
 Clark's Special Battalion, 16th Militia
 Whitman's Company, 66th Battalion, Militia

Home Guards

 1st Home Guards
 2nd Home Guards
 3rd Home Guards
 4th Home Guards
 5th Home Guards
 6th Home Guards
 7th Home Guards
 8th Home Guards
 1st Battalion, Home Guards
 2nd Battalion, Home Guards
 3rd Battalion, Home Guards
 4th Battalion, Home Guards
 7th Battalion, Home Guards
 8th Battalion, Home Guards
 10th Battalion, Home Guards
 14th Battalion, Home Guards

 18th Battalion, Home Guards
 21st Battalion, Home Guards
 22nd Battalion, Home Guards
 23rd Battalion, Home Guards
 24th Battalion, Home Guards
 26th Battalion, Home Guards
 27th Battalion, Home Guards
 29th Battalion, Home Guards
 37th Battalion, Home Guards
 48th Battalion, Home Guards
 59th Battalion, Home Guards
 63rd Battalion, Home Guards
 64th Battalion, Home Guards
 68th Battalion, Home Guards
 69th Battalion, Home Guards
 72nd Battalion, Home Guards

Local Defense Troops
 2nd Battalion, Local Defense Troops
 Allen's Company, Local Defense
 Cox's Company, Local Defense (Provost Guard, Kinston)
 Croom's Company, Local Defense (Kinston Guards, Kinston Provost Guard)
 Gibb's Company, Local Defense
 Griswold's Company, Local Defense (Provost Guard, Goldsboro)
 Hoskins' Company, Local Defense 
 Howard's Company, Local Defense Cavalry 
 Lee's Company, Local Defense (Silver Greys)
 Nelson's Company, Local Defense)
 Snead's Company, Local Defense

See also
Lists of American Civil War Regiments by State

References

 
North Carolina
Civil War